Radev (Bulgarian: Радев) may refer to:

Radev (surname)
Radev Point in Antarctica
The Radev Collection of artworks in London, UK